The 2000 season was the Minnesota Vikings' 40th in the National Football League (NFL). They won the NFC Central division title with an 11–5 record and beat the New Orleans Saints in the divisional round of the playoffs before losing 41–0 to the New York Giants in the NFC Championship Game.

After not retaining either Randall Cunningham or Jeff George, the team was led by first-year starting quarterback Daunte Culpepper and running back Robert Smith, who ran for a then team record 1,521 yards and seven touchdowns. The Vikings started out 7–0 and were 11–2 after 14 weeks, but slumped briefly, losing their last three to the St. Louis Rams, Green Bay Packers and Indianapolis Colts while Culpepper was hampered by injury.

Despite the rough patch, the Vikings would return to the playoffs again for the fifth straight year. After easily beating the Saints in the Divisional game 34–16, they were defeated 41–0 by the New York Giants in the Conference Championship, and to top that, Robert Smith retired at the end of the year, after only playing eight NFL seasons. It would be 2004 before the Vikings returned to the playoffs.

After a contract dispute, Hall of Fame defensive tackle John Randle was let go after 11 seasons with the Vikings. Randle had only eight sacks this year, ending a streak of eight consecutive seasons with 10+ sacks.

Seven Vikings including Culpepper, Moss, Carter, Smith, Korey Stringer, Robert Griffith and Matt Birk were selected to play in the Pro Bowl after the season. It was Stringer's only Pro Bowl appearance before his death in 2001.

Offseason

2000 Draft

 During the 1999 NFL Draft, Washington traded their 1999 first-round selection (11th overall), 1999 third-round selection (73rd overall) and 2000 second-round selection (56th overall) to Minnesota in exchange for QB Brad Johnson.
 The details of these trades are unknown but may involve Baltimore's acquisition of OL Everett Lindsay from Minnesota.
 Washington received this selection as compensation for restricted free agent G Brad Badger.
 Minnesota traded their seventh-round selection (232nd overall) to Cleveland for DT Jerry Ball.

Undrafted free agents

Preseason

Schedule

Game summaries

Week 1: vs. New Orleans Saints

Week 2: at San Diego Chargers

Week 3: vs. Arizona Cardinals

Week 4: at Indianapolis Colts

Regular season

Schedule

Note: Intra-division opponents are in bold text.

Game summaries

Week 1: vs. Chicago Bears

Week 2: vs. Miami Dolphins

Week 3: at New England Patriots

Week 5: at Detroit Lions

Week 6: vs. Tampa Bay Buccaneers

Week 7: at Chicago Bears

Week 8: vs. Buffalo Bills

Week 9: at Tampa Bay Buccaneers

Week 10: at Green Bay Packers

Week 11: vs. Arizona Cardinals

Week 12: vs. Carolina Panthers

Week 13: at Dallas Cowboys

Week 14: vs. Detroit Lions

Week 15: at St. Louis Rams

Week 16: vs. Green Bay Packers

Week 17: at Indianapolis Colts

Standings

Postseason

Schedule

Game summaries

NFC Divisional Playoffs: vs (#3) New Orleans Saints

NFC Championship Game: vs (#1) New York Giants

Statistics

Team leaders

League rankings

Staff

Roster

Awards and records
Gary Anderson, NFC Special Teams Player of the Week, Week 8 
Mitch Berger, NFC Special Teams Player of the Week, Week 14 
Mitch Berger, NFC Special Teams Player of the Month, December 
Cris Carter, All-NFL Team (as selected by the Associated Press, Pro Football Weekly and the Pro Football Writers of America)
Cris Carter, NFC Pro Bowl Selection
Daunte Culpepper, NFC Offensive Player of the Week, Week 6
Daunte Culpepper, NFC Offensive Player of the Week, Week 12
Chris Hovan, PFW/Pro Football Writers of America All-Rookie Team
Randy Moss, All-NFL Team (as selected by the Associated Press, Pro Football Weekly and the Pro Football Writers of America)
Randy Moss, PFW/PFWA All-Pro Team
Robert Smith, NFC Offensive Player of the Month, December

40-year team
The Vikings named an all-time team in 2000 in recognition of the franchise's 40th year in the NFL.

Offense
WR: Ahmad Rashad, Cris Carter
T: Ron Yary, Tim Irwin
G: Ed White, Randall McDaniel
C: Mick Tingelhoff
TE: Steve Jordan
QB: Fran Tarkenton
RB: Chuck Foreman, Robert Smith
K: Fred Cox
ST: Bill Brown
Defense
DE: Jim Marshall, Carl Eller
DT: Alan Page, John Randle
LB: Jeff Siemon, Matt Blair, Scott Studwell
S: Paul Krause, Joey Browner
CB: Bobby Bryant, Carl Lee
P: Greg Coleman
RS: Darrin Nelson
Head coach: Bud Grant

References

Minnesota Vikings seasons
Minnesota
NFC Central championship seasons
Minnesota